Chuma Township (Mandarin: 初麻乡) is a township in Hualong Hui Autonomous County, Haidong, Qinghai, China. In 2010, Chuma Township had a total population of 5,841: 2,971 males and 2,870 females:1,641 aged under 14, 3,858 aged between 15 and 65 and 342 aged over 65.

References 
 

Township-level divisions of Qinghai
Haidong